The Roman Catholic Diocese of San Bernardo is a diocese located in the city of San Bernardo in the Ecclesiastical province of Santiago de Chile in Chile.

History
13 July 1987: Established as Diocese of San Bernardo from the Metropolitan Archdiocese of Santiago de Chile

Leadership
 Bishops of San Bernardo (Roman rite), in reverse chronological order
 Bishop Juan Ignacio González Errázuriz (2003.10.10 – present)
 Bishop Orozimbo Fuenzalida y Fuenzalida (1987.07.13 – 2003.10.10)

Sources
 GCatholic.org
 Catholic Hierarchy
 Diocese website

Roman Catholic dioceses in Chile
Christian organizations established in 1987
Roman Catholic dioceses and prelatures established in the 20th century
San Bernardo, Roman Catholic Diocese of
1987 establishments in Chile